Sultan Hamid Sultan is an Afghan scholar, professor and politician.  He was the Transportation Minister of the transitional government in Afghanistan.   After leaving the ministry, he returned to teaching at a university in Iran.

Biography
Sultan Hamid Sultan was born in 1948 in Kabul, Afghanistan. He studied at the Kabul University.  Then he received a scholarship in Iran. After the fall of the Taliban in Afghanistan, he became the transportation Minister.

References

Living people
1948 births